The 9th Hong Kong Awards ceremony, honored the best films of 1989 and took place on 8 April 1990 at Hong Kong Academy for Performing Arts, Wan Chai, Hong Kong. The ceremony was hosted by Philip Chan and John Sham, during the ceremony awards are presented in 15 categories.

Awards
Winners are listed first, highlighted in boldface, and indicated with a double dagger.

References

External links
Official website of the Hong Kong Film Awards

1990
1989 film awards
1990 in Hong Kong